The Laurel Award for Screenwriting Achievement (also known as the Screen Laurel Award) is a lifetime achievement award given by the Writers Guild of America. It is given "to that member of the Guild who, in the opinion of the current Board of Directors, has advanced the literature of the motion picture through the years, and who has made outstanding contributions to the profession of the screen writer." With the exception of 2009 in which no award was given, it has been presented annually since the 6th Writers Guild of America Awards in 1953. Billy Wilder is the only person to win the award multiple times, winning in 1957 and 1980 (both as part of a partnership).

Recipients

1950s

1960s

1970s

1980s

1990s

2000s

2010s

2020s

References

External links
Official Description of the Laurel Award for Screenwriting Achievement and list of recipients

Writers Guild of America Awards
Lifetime achievement awards